Muhammad Muhelmy bin Suhaimi (born 22 January 1996) is a Singaporean professional footballer who plays as a midfielder for Singapore Premier League side Lion City Sailors and the Singapore national team.

Career 

He played for the Tampines Rovers Prime League squad before joining the Young Lions FC.   He was selected for training in France and was involved in two friendly matches for Metz, against RC Strasbourg on their second day there, and FC Sarrebourg, a day before they were scheduled to return home.

He was with the Young Lions since 2016.

In 2016, he was also called up to the inaugural national cup held in Malaysia.

Personal life 

Muhaimin is the son of former jockey Suhaimi Salleh and Sarina Durimi. His brother, Muhaimin Suhaimi, plays as a midfielder for the national youth teams.

He receives the Singapore Pools' Passport to Excellence prize, which funds the cost of sending him for an overseas training stint. Singapore Pools launched the incentive in 2010 to nurture young sports talent, in line with its commitment as a leading partner in the sports community.

He was unveiled as the winner of this year's The New Paper Dollah Kassim Award in 2014.

Career statistics

References

External links 
  on Facebook

1995 births
Living people
Singaporean footballers
Association football forwards
Young Lions FC players
Singapore Premier League players
Footballers at the 2010 Summer Youth Olympics
Competitors at the 2017 Southeast Asian Games
Southeast Asian Games competitors for Singapore